Tenida and Co. is an upcoming Bengali adventure comedy film directed by Sayantan Ghosal based on the novel Jhau Bungalowr Rahasya by Narayan Gangopadhyay. This is the third film of Tenida series and Kanchan Mullick is playing the role of main protagonist, Tenida.

Plot
Tenida and his friends Kyabla, Habul, Pala go for a vacation in Darjeeling. One scientist Satkari Santra asks them for help to protect his valuable formula from a Japani spy Kagamachi. Satkari invites Tenida and his associates in his residence, Jhau Bungalow but Kyabla finds Satkari himself is very misleading person. They try to reveal the mystery behind Satkari's story.

Cast
 Kanchan Mullick as Tenida
 Sabyasachi Chakrabarty as Satkari Santra
 Gaurav Chakrabarty as Kyabla
 Ridhima Ghosh as Satkari's daughter
 Soumendra Bhattacharya as Pyala
 Sourav Saha as Habul
Mithu Chakrabarty

References

External links
 

2022 films
Indian children's films
2020s adventure comedy films
Films based on Indian novels
Indian adventure comedy films
Bengali-language Indian films
2020s Bengali-language films
Films based on works by Narayan Gangopadhyay